Ebrahim Monsefi (in Persian: ابراهیم منصفی, 1945, Bandar Abbas – 1997) was an Iranian singer, musician and poet.

References

20th-century Iranian male singers
1945 births
1997 deaths